The Minister of State for Foreign Affairs (MSFA) is the junior minister within the Cabinet of Pakistan who serves as the second highest-ranking member of the Ministry of Foreign Affairs, after the Foreign Minister.

During the absence of a Foreign Minister, Minister of State takes the de facto charge Ministry of Foreign Affairs. There were two such instances in the past; Siddiq Khan Kanju was the effective Foreign Minister from 1991 to 1993 and Inam-ul-Haq for four months in 2002.

List of Ministers of State for Foreign Affairs of Pakistan

See also
Ministry of Foreign Affairs
Foreign Minister of Pakistan
Foreign Secretary of Pakistan

References

External links
 Ministers of State for Foreign Affairs 
 Ministry of Foreign Affairs

Ministry of Foreign Affairs (Pakistan)